The Pennsylvania Avenue Line, designated Routes 32, 34, and 36 (formerly served by Routes 30 and 35 as well), is a daily Metrobus  route in Washington, D.C., Operating between the Southern Avenue station or Naylor Road station of the Green Line of the Washington Metro and the Archives station of the Green and Yellow Lines of the Washington Metro or Potomac Park. Until the 1960s, it was a streetcar line, opened in 1862 by the Washington and Georgetown Railroad as the first line in the city.

The current routing also incorporates portions of the Naylor Road Line, formerly a standalone route.

Current route
Route 32 and 36 begin at the Potomac Park apartments near the Foggy Bottom–GWU station and follow H and I Streets to Pennsylvania Avenue. Route 34 begins at the Archives station and continues east along the same route. The three bus routes travel across Southeast and over the Sousa Bridge. At L'Enfant Square, the routes separate. Routes 32 and 34 take Naylor Road, while Route 36 continues along Pennsylvania to Branch Avenue. Route 32 terminates at the Southern Avenue station, just across the Maryland border, while Routes 34 and 36 finish at Naylor Road station, also in Maryland. Both stations are served by the Green Line.

Routes 32 and 36 operate seven days a week, but Route 34 only operates on weekdays. All three routes are supplemented by the Wisconsin Avenue Line, operated by Routes 31 and 33, which traverse the same route as the 32, 34, and 36, but continue north along Wisconsin Avenue to Friendship Heights station. As of November 2022, the 34 Route has been suspended and the 32 and 36 have increased service.

The line currently operates out of Andrews Federal Center division with some trips operated out of Shepherd Parkway division. Prior to being moved to Andrews, the line operated both out of Bladensburg and Western division at some points.

Route 32 stops

{| class="wikitable collapsible collapsed" style="font-size: 95%;"
|-
!Bus stop
!Direction
!Connections
|-
!colspan="3"|Washington, D.C.
|-
!Virginia Avenue NW / E Street NWPotomac Park
|Eastbound stop,Westbound terminal
| Metrobus: 11Y, 31, 36, 39, 42, 43
|-
!F Street NW / 21st Street NW
|Westbound
| Metrobus: 31, 36, 42, 43 
|-
!F Street NW / 22nd Street NW
|Westbound
| Metrobus: 31, 36, 42, 43 
|-
!23rd Street NW / G Street NW
|Bidirectional
| Metrobus: 31, 36, 42, 43, H1, L1, X1 
|-
!23rd Street NW / I Street NWFoggy Bottom-GWU station
|Bidirectional
| Metrobus: 31, 36, 39, H1, L1, X1   Washington Metro:    
|-
!Pennsylvania Avenue NW / 22nd Street NW
|Bidirectional
| Metrobus: 33, 36, 38B  DC Circulator:  Georgetown – Union Station 
|-
!Pennsylvania Avenue NW / 21st Street NW
|Eastbound
| Metrobus: 33, 36, 39  DC Circulator:  Georgetown – Union Station
|-
!I Street NW / 20th Street NW
|Westbound
| Metrobus: 33, 36, 38B 
|-
!I Street NW / 19th Street NW
|Westbound
| Metrobus: 3Y, 16Y, 33, 36, 37, 39, 38B 
|-
!H Street NW / 18th Street NWFarragut West station
|Eastbound
| Metrobus: 3Y, 16Y, 33, 36, 42, 43 MTA Maryland Bus: 305, 325 PRTC OmniRide  Washington Metro:   
|-
!I Street NW / 18th Street NWFarragut West station
|Westbound
| Metrobus: 3Y, 16Y, 32, 36, 38B PRTC OmniRide  Washington Metro:    
|-
!H Street NW / 17th Street NW (Eastbound)I Street NW / 17th Street NW (Westbound)Farragut Square
|Bidirectional
| Metrobus: 3Y, 11Y, 16Y, 33, 36, 37, 38B, 39, D1, D5, D6, G8, L2, N2, N4, N6, S1 DC Circulator:  Georgetown – Union Station MTA Maryland Bus: 901, 902, 904, 905, 909, 950, 995 Loudoun County Transit PRTC OmniRide Washington Metro:    (at Farragut West station)  (at Farragut North station)
|-
!H Street NW / Madison Place NWMcPherson Square station
|Eastbound
| Metrobus: 11Y, 33, 36, 37, 39, G8, S2, S9, X2  Washington Metro:    
|-
!I Street NW / 15th Street NWMcPherson Square station
|Westbound
| Metrobus: 11Y, 33, 36, 37, 39, G8, S2, S9, X2  Washington Metro:   
|-
!15th Street NW / New York Avenue NW
|Eastbound
| Metrobus: 11Y, 33, 36 
|-
!15th Street NW / F Street NW
|Westbound
| Metrobus: 33, 36 
|-
!Pennsylvania Avenue NW / 14th Street NW
|Bidirectional
| Metrobus: 11Y, 16E, 33, 36, 52 
|-
!Pennsylvania Avenue NW  / 13th Street NW Federal Triangle station
|Eastbound
| Metrobus: 33, 36, 37, 39, A9 Washington Metro:   
|-
!Pennsylvania Avenue NW  / 12th Street NW Federal Triangle station
|Westbound
| Metrobus: 33, 36, 37, 39, A9 Washington Metro:   
|-
!Pennsylvania Avenue NW / 10th Street NW
|Bidirectional
| Metrobus: 16C, 33, 34, 36, 37, 59, P6, S2  MTA Maryland Bus: 610, 620, 640, 650, 705, 715, 820  PRTC OmniRide 
|-
!Pennsylvania Avenue NW  / 7th Street NWArchives station
|Bidirectional
| Metrobus: 16C, 34, 36, 37, 39, 70, 74, 79, A9, P6  MTA Maryland Bus: 610, 640, 650, 705, 810, 820, 830, 840  PRTC OmniRide Washington Metro:   
|-
!Pennsylvania Avenue NW / Constitution Avenue NW
|Westbound
| Metrobus: 34, 36, P6, X1 
|-
!4th Street SW / Madison Drive SW
|Westbound
| Metrobus: 34, 36, 39, P6 
|-
!Independence Avenue SW / 6th Street SW
|Eastbound
| Metrobus: 34, 36, 39
|-
!Independence Avenue SW / 4th Street SW
|Westbound
| Metrobus: 34, 36, 39, P6 
|-
!Independence Avenue SW / 3rd Street SW
|Eastbound
| Metrobus:  34, 36, 39, P6
|-
!Independence Avenue SW / Washington Avenue SW
|Westbound
| Metrobus: 34, 36
|-
!Independence Avenue SW / 1st Street SW
|Eastbound
| Metrobus: 34, 36 
|-
!Independence Avenue SE / South Capitol Street
|Eastbound
| Metrobus: 34, 36 
|-
!Independence Avenue SE / New Jersey Avenue SE
|Westbound
| Metrobus: 34, 36 
|-
!Independence Avenue SE / 1st Street SE Capitol South station
|Bidirectional
| Metrobus: 34, 36, 39 Washington Metro:    
|-
!Independence Avenue SE / 2nd Street SE
|Eastbound
| Metrobus: 34, 36 
|-
!Pennsylvania Avenue SE / 3rd Street SE
|Westbound
| Metrobus: 34, 36 
|-
!Pennsylvania Avenue SE / North Carolina Avenue SE
|Eastbound
| Metrobus: 34, 36 
|-
!Pennsylvania Avenue SE / 4th Street SE
|Westbound
| Metrobus: 34, 36 
|-
!Pennsylvania Avenue SE / 6th Street SE
|Bidirectional
| Metrobus: 34, 36 
|-
!Pennsylvania Avenue SE / 8th Street SEEastern Market station
|Bidirectional
| Metrobus: 34, 36, 39, 90, 92  DC Circulator: Eastern Market – L'Enfant Plaza Congress Heights – Union Station Washington Metro:    
|-
!Pennsylvania Avenue SE / E Street SE
|Bidirectional
| Metrobus: 34, 36 
|-
!Pennsylvania Avenue SE / 13th Street SE
|Bidirectional
| Metrobus: 34, 36 
|-
!Pennsylvania Avenue SE / Potomac Avenue SEPotomac Avenue station
|Bidirectional
| Metrobus: 34, 36, B2, M6, V1, V4  Washington Metro:    
|-
!Pennsylvania Avenue SE / 15th Street SE
|Eastbound
| Metrobus: 34, 36, B2, M6, V1, V4 
|-
!Pennsylvania Avenue SE / L'Enfant Square SE
|Bidirectional
| Metrobus: 34, 36, 39, B2, M6, V1, V2, V4
|-
!Minnesota Avenue SE / White Place SE
|Westbound
| Metrobus: 34, A31, B2, V2 
|-
!23rd Street SE / Q Street SE
|Westbound
| Metrobus: 34 
|-
!25th Street SE / Park Place SE
|Eastbound
| Metrobus: 34
|-
!25th Street SE / R Street SE
|Eastbound
| Metrobus: 34
|-
!Naylor Road SE / R Street SE
|Westbound
| Metrobus: 34 
|-
!Naylor Road SE / S Street SE
|Bidirectional
| Metrobus: 34
|-
!Naylor Road SE / Park Naylor Apartments
|Bidirectional
| Metrobus: 34
|-
!#2619 Naylor Road SE
|Eastbound
| Metrobus: 34
|-
!#2637 Naylor Road SE
|Westbound
| Metrobus: 34
|-
!Good Hope Road SE / 25th Street SE
|Eastbound
| Metrobus: 32, 92, A32, W2, W3, W6
|-
!Naylor Road SE / Good Hope Road SE
|Westbound
| Metrobus: 34, 92, W2, W3, W4, W6, W8
|-
!Naylor Road SE / Alabama Avenue SE
|Eastbound
| Metrobus: 34, 92, A32, V7, W2, W3, W4, W6, W8 
|-
!Alabama Avenue SE / 25th Street SE
|Eastbound
| Metrobus: 92, A32, V7, W4, W6 
|-
!Alabama Avenue SE / Ainger Place SE
|Bidirectional
| Metrobus: 92, A32, V7, W2, W3, W4, W6, W8 
|-
!Alabama Avenue SE / Hartford Street SE
|Bidirectional
| Metrobus: 92, A32, V7, W2, W3, W4, W6, W8 
|-
!Alabama Avenue SE / Irving Place SE
|Eastbound
| Metrobus: 92, A32, V7, W4, W6, W8 
|-
!Alabama Avenue SE / Jasper Street SE
|Westbound
| Metrobus: 92, A32, V7, W4, W6, W8 
|-
!Alabama Avenue SE / 24th Street SE
|Bidirectional
| Metrobus: 92, A32, V7, W4, W6, W8 
|-
!23rd Street SE / Alabama Avenue SE
|Bidirectional
| Metrobus: 92, A32, V7, W4, W6, W8 
|-
!Savannah Street SE / 24th Street SE
|Eastbound
| Metrobus: A32 
|-
!Savannah Street SE / 23rd Street SE
|Westbound
| Metrobus: A32 
|-
!22nd Street SE / Southern Avenue SE
|Westbound
|
|-
!22nd Street  / Savannah Street SE
|Westbound
| 
|-
!#3417 25th Street SE
|Eastbound
| Metrobus: A32
|-
!25th Street SE / Southern Avenue
|Eastbound
| Metrobus: A32, W2, W3 
|-
!Southern Avenue  / 22nd Street SE
|Eastbound
| Metrobus: A32, W2, W3 
|-
!Southern Avenue  / Mississippi Avenue SE
|Bidirectional
| Metrobus: A32, W2, W3 
|-
!Southern Avenue  / Valley Terrace SE
|Bidirectional
| Metrobus: A32, W1 
|-
!colspan="3"|Temple Hills, Maryland
|-
!Southern Avenue StationBus Bay A
|Westbound stop, Eastbound terminal
| Metrobus: A2, A32, D12, D14, NH1, P12, P18, P19, W1, W2, W14 TheBus: 33, 35, 37 Washington Metro:  
|-

|}

Route 34 stops

Route 36 stops

History
The Pennsylvania Avenue Line was the main line of the Capital Traction Company, connecting Georgetown to the Navy Yard. As authorized in the charter, it began at M Street North and Wisconsin Avenue in Georgetown, and headed east and southeast across Rock Creek on the Pennsylvania Avenue Bridge (shared with the Washington Aqueduct). Because the White House and Capitol lie directly in the line of Pennsylvania Avenue, diversions were made around the White House to the north and east via 15th Street Northwest and around the south edge of the Capitol Grounds. At the time, this meant that it turned south along the current western boundary (First Street West) between the two traffic circles, but continued to curve southeast and east to the intersection of A Street South and First Street East, where Pennsylvania Avenue restarted. The line continued along Pennsylvania Avenue to Eighth Street Southeast, turning south to end at the Navy Yard. A branch to the Baltimore and Ohio Railroad station ran northeast from Pennsylvania Avenue and First Street West to New Jersey Avenue and B Street North, heading east on B Street and south just east of the Capitol to rejoin the main line.Samuel Augustus Mitchell, Plan of the City of Washington, 1870, accessed via the David Rumsey Map Collection Trains began running between the Capitol and White House on July 29, 1862, and the line was extended west to Washington Circle on August 12, Georgetown on August 18, and east to the Navy Yard on October 2. Connections could also be made to the Baltimore and Potomac Railroad station at Sixth Street once it opened in 1872.

On March 3, 1875, the Washington and Georgetown and Metropolitan Railroad were "directed to take up such portions of their tracks as may come in way of the improvement of the Capitol Grounds". This improvement gave the Capitol Grounds their present shape, bounded by First Street West and East and B Street North and South, and the Pennsylvania Avenue Line was moved to First Street West and B Street South. The B&O station branch was moved to First Avenue West and C Street North, ending at New Jersey Avenue; this had been the route of the B&O before its tracks (actually those of the Alexandria and Washington Railroad) were ripped up in 1872.

Also on March 3, 1875, the Washington and Georgetown was required to move its line from the Pennsylvania Avenue Bridge to the M Street Bridge via 26th Street West. The old bridge was reconstructed in the mid-1910s, with Capital Traction paying one-third of the cost, and cars moved back to Pennsylvania on July 7, 1916 (eastbound), and July 15 (westbound).

On August 23, 1894, the company was required to, within a year, build a union station at the Georgetown end of the Aqueduct Bridge and extend its line west to it, where passengers could transfer to lines into Virginia.

The Pennsylvania Avenue Line was extended southeast to the Pennsylvania Avenue Bridge over the Anacostia River in the late 1890s, with some cars running there and some continuing to serve the Navy Yard.

A loop off the line through the West End of Washington was authorized on June 4, 1900 and opened on March 24, 1901. Westbound cars could turn south on 17th Street West, west on G Street North, and north on 25th Street West to return to Pennsylvania Avenue, while the eastbound track was laid in 26th Street West, F Street North, and 17th Street West. A track in G Street between 25th and 26th Streets allowed for a short-turn service, reversing direction at 26th Street.Greeters of America, Greeters' Guide to Washington, 1922, pp. 61–63

On May 23, 1908, Congress authorized extensions of several companies to serve the new Union Station. The Capital Traction's branch to the old B&O station was extended east on C Street and northeast on Delaware Avenue to the station, and a second route between this branch and the tracks towards the east ran via First Street East and B Street North to Delaware Avenue (over trackage owned by other companies).

A second loop through the West End was approved on December 7, 1916, from Pennsylvania Avenue south to Virginia Avenue near West Potomac Park via 18th and 19th Streets.

After consolidation
After Capital Traction and the Washington Railway and Electric Company were merged in 1933 to form the Capital Transit Company, some of the redundant lines were abandoned. This included the WR&E's Georgetown line between Connecticut and Wisconsin Avenues, resulting in Cabin John Line and Tenleytown Line cars, and cars of other lines that ran to Georgetown, being routed via Pennsylvania Avenue between Georgetown and the White House. When numbers were assigned to the car routes in 1936, the following regular routes used the Pennsylvania Avenue Line:
 10, Rosslyn to Kenilworth via the Pennsylvania Avenue Line and ex-WR&E Columbia Line (discontinued May 1, 1949)
 20, Cabin John to Union Station via the ex-WR&E Cabin John Line and Pennsylvania Avenue Line (discontinued January 3, 1960)
 30, Friendship Heights to Barney Circle via the ex-WR&E Tennallytown Line and Pennsylvania Avenue Line (discontinued January 3, 1960)
 54, Brightwood to the Navy Yard via the Fourteenth Street Line and Pennsylvania Avenue Line (discontinued January 28, 1962)
 80, Rosslyn to Brookland via the Pennsylvania Avenue Line and ex-WR&E Brookland Line (discontinued September 7, 1958)
 82, Potomac Park to Branchville via the Pennsylvania Avenue Line and ex-WR&E Maryland Line (discontinued September 7, 1958)
 90, Calvert Street Bridge to Barney Circle via the U Street Line, New Jersey Avenue Line, and Pennsylvania Avenue Line (discontinued January 28, 1962)

Thus Pennsylvania Avenue Line streetcars (Route 30) were discontinued on January 3, 1960, and the tracks east of 14th Street Northwest were last used on January 28, 1962. Route 54 buses still serve a small part of Pennsylvania Avenue, used by the 50 streetcar line.

The East Washington Heights Traction Company's streetcars, which ran from Barney Circle to Randle Highlands via the Sousa Bridge, were replaced by buses on December 1, 1923, originally numbered Route C2 in 1936, before eventually being renamed as routes, "32 & 34". The 32 streetcar line operated between Shipley Terrace & Friendship Heights; while the 34 streetcar line operated between Hillcrest & Friendship Heights.

The Capital Traction Company began operating buses to Hillcrest and Good Hope on December 23, 1924, originally numbered as Route C6 in 1936, before eventually being renamed as routes, "35 & 36". Both the 35 & 36 bus routes operated between Hillcrest & Friendship Heights, just like the 34 bus route, only with the exception that 35 & 36 would divert off of the intersection of Naylor Road SE onto the intersection of Branch Avenue SE, then operate on Branch Avenue SE, before operating on Pennsylvania Avenue SE, while 34 would remain straight on Naylor Road SE, then divert onto 23rd Street SE (to Friendship Heights), 25th Street SE (to Hillcrest), and Minnesota Avenue SE (to Hillcrest), before operating on Pennsylvania Avenue SE.

Later, routes 32, 34, 35, and 36 would operate under DC Transit after streetcars were phased out. Routes 30, 32, 34, 35, and 36 eventually became Metrobus routes on February 4, 1973 when WMATA acquired DC Transit and three other transit agencies all operating their original routes.

Service Changes

On July 15, 1977, when Potomac Avenue, Eastern Market, Federal Triangle, McPherson Square, Farragut West, and Foggy Bottom–GWU stations opened, the 32, 34, 35, and 36 began serving each of those Metro Stations in the middle of their routes. No route changes were made during this particular time. 

On April 30, 1983, when Archives station opened, the 32, 34, 35, & 36 began serving Archives station in the middle of their routes. No route changes were made during this particular time. However, the 30 streetcar line, which had been discontinued, was reincarnated to operate as a new Metrobus Route between Archives station and Friendship Heights.

On August 25, 1984 when Friendship Heights station opened, the 30, 32, 34, 35, and 36 were all extended from their original Friendship Heights terminus at the intersection of Wisconsin Avenue NW and Western Avenue NW, to instead terminate at the newly opened Friendship Heights station. During this same exact time, the 30, 32, 34, 35, and 36 also began serving the newly opened Tenleytown–AU station. The routes remained on Wisconsin Avenue instead of diverting onto Fort Drive Road and 40th Street to serve Tenleytown.

On January 13, 2001 when both Naylor Road & Southern Avenue stations opened, routes 34, 35, and 36 were extended south of their original Naylor Gardens (34 and 35) and Hillcrest (36) terminus, to instead terminate at the newly opened Naylor Road station while the 32 was extended south of its original Shipley Terrace terminus, to instead terminate at the newly opened Southern Avenue station. Route 30 was also extended to operate all the way between the Friendship Heights and Potomac Avenue station. The 35 was rerouted on 30th Street between Erie Street and Naylor Road and route. 36 was extended via 31st, Erie and 30th streets and Naylor Road. Route 30 was not affected by the changes.

On June 29, 2008, there were several major changes made to the Pennsylvania Avenue Line as part of a restructuring effort after proposals from riders. 

The 30, 34 and 35 routes were completely discontinued and replaced by new routes 31, 37, and 39, plus the existing routes 32, 36. The 34 was replaced by a new route M5 under the Naylor Road Line, which would operate between the Naylor Road station & Eastern Market station. Route 30 which only operated during weekday peak-hours only, was replaced by the brand new route 37 under the Wisconsin Avenue Limited Line, which was designed to operate as a limited-stop MetroExtra Route, that would provide express service between Friendship Heights station & Archives station which was route 30's routing from 1984 to 2001.

WMATA also created a new route 39 under the Pennsylvania Avenue Limited Line to provide new limited stop Metrobus service between the Naylor Road station and Foggy Bottom during weekday peak-hours only like the 37. WMATA also created a new route 31 under the Wisconsin Avenue Line to provide extra service between Foggy Bottom–GWU station & Friendship Heights, to ease up crowding on the 32 and 36.

On December 28, 2008, the M5 was renamed as Route 34 which was also extended to Archives station. The new 34 would operate between Naylor Road station and Archives station operating on portions of routes 32 and 36. Additionally, 34 operated as part of the Naylor Road Line, instead of operating as part of the Pennsylvania Avenue Line instead.

In 2013, WMATA announced proposals to simplify the busy Pennsylvania Avenue Line and Naylor Road Line. Under the proposals, Routes 32 and 36 will terminate at Foggy Bottom with a new 30s line to replace portions of the 32, and 36, and discontinue the 34 with four options to replace the 32 and 36. According to WMATA, it proposes the following:
 Option 1: Same as Route 32 between Southern Avenue and Potomac Avenue Station SE, then west to Georgetown via Lincoln Park, Union Station, and Thomas Circle, and then follow Route 31 between Georgetown and Friendship Heights.
 Option 2: Same as Route 32 between Southern Avenue and Eastern Market, then west to Georgetown via 8th Street, Massachusetts Avenue, Union Station, and Thomas Circle, and then follow Route 31 between Georgetown and Friendship Heights.
 Option 3: Same as Route 32 between Southern Avenue and Independence Ave & 7th St SW, then west to Foggy Bottom via Independence Ave, 17th St SW, Virginia Ave, and Washington Circle, and then follow Route 31 to Friendship Heights.
 Option 4: Same as Route 32 between Southern Avenue and Anacostia Freeway SE, then west to Foggy Bottom via Anacostia Freeway, Southeast/Southwest Freeway, Maine Avenue, 17th St SW, Virginia Ave, and Washington Circle, and then follow Route 31 to Friendship Heights.

This was in order to improve service frequency, reliability and efficiency of 30s Line routes and provide transfer-free bus service between Southeast DC and Upper Northwest that bypasses downtown traffic congestion.

On August 24, 2014, changes were made to the Pennsylvania Avenue Line as part of another reconstructing effort.

Route 32 & 36 were both rerouted to operate to Foggy Bottom–GWU station, instead of operating to Friendship Heights station being replacing 30N and 30S which covers the same routes as route 32 and 36. Both the 30N and 30S would operate 24 hours a day with each trips every hour from each other.

A new route 33 was also introduced to operate alongside the 31. The 33 provides service along Wisconsin Avenue NW to provide discontinued service from the 32 and 36 lines running from Friendship Heights station and Federal Triangle.

The 32 and 36 will operate alongside the 34 with the Naylor Road Line name being discontinued and replaced by the current Pennsylvania Avenue Line''' name.

In 2015, WMATA proposed to eliminate all evening and weekend service for route 34 due to riders mostly riding routes 30N, 30S, 32, and 36.

On March 27, 2016, route 34 discontinued all late-night service after 9:19 PM and all weekend service, with alternative service provided by the 30N and 36.

Beginning on December 15, 2019, routes 32, 34, and 36 along with routes 30N, 30S, and 39 were rerouted to travel across the National Mall along 4th Street between Pennsylvania Avenue NW and Independence Avenue SW towards Archives, Friendship Heights and Potomac Park instead of 7th Street to provide a more direct service to the route.

During the COVID-19 pandemic, all route 34 service was suspended and all route 32 and 36 service was reduced to operate on its Saturday supplemental schedule beginning on March 16, 2020. However beginning on March 18, 2020, route 32 and 36 was further reduced to operate on its Sunday schedule. Service on weekends were also suspended being replaced by the 30N and 30S that operated every 30 minutes. On August 23, 2020, route 32 and 36 service had their normal weekday schedule restored with an increased weekend service to replace weekend route 30N and 30S service which was suspended. However, route 34 remained suspended.

During WMATA's 2021 fiscal year budget, it was proposed for the 34 to be fully eliminated as it overlaps both routes 32 and 36 in order to simplify the 30s line. However WMATA later backed out the elimination of the 34 on April 2, 2020. The 34 elimination was brought back on February 20, 2021 during WMATA's FY2022 budget.

On September 5, 2021, the line was increased to operate every 12 minutes daily between both the 32 and 36.

References

External links
 Metrobus
 The Metrobus 30s Line Study, sponsored by the Washington Metropolitan Area Transit Authority in conjunction with the District of Columbia Department of Transportation

Street railways in Washington, D.C.
32
1862 establishments in Washington, D.C.